Rocky Nelson, an Arizona entrepreneur, formed Arizona Airways in 1942, using Douglas DC-3 aircraft to fly passengers from Sky Harbor International Airport in Phoenix, to other, nearby destinations, including Prescott Municipal Airport in Prescott, Arizona, and Tucson International Airport in Tucson, Arizona.

History
On April 7, 1946, Arizona Airways began intrastate airline service on three routes within Arizona: Phoenix-Prescott-Kingman, Phoenix-Prescott-Flagstaff, and Phoenix-Casa Grande/Coolidge-Tucson-Nogales. Service was later extended from Flagstaff to Winslow, AZ. From Nogales, service was extended onto Douglas/Bisbee, AZ, and a new route from Phoenix to Yuma was added. Their specialty was scenic tours of northern Arizona, especially the Grand Canyon. See articles below for more early history.

The Civil Aeronautics Board issued them a certificate in January, 1948, with an airmail contract from Phoenix to El Paso with intermediate stops at Globe, Safford, and Clifton, AZ as well as Lordsburg, Deming, and Las Cruces, NM. By then the carrier's finances were precarious and the CAB approved a merger with Monarch Airlines and Challenger Airlines in the spring of 1950, which took effect June 1, 1950.

The airline had three DC-3: N-75028, N-64910, and N-57985 at the merger. Their Sunliner names at Frontier Airlines became Teton, Williston Basin and Yellowstone.

Rocky Nelson was Founder and President of Arizona Airways from its founding in 1942 until its merger with Challenger and Monarch Airlines June 1, 1950, to form Frontier Airlines, headquartered in Denver, Colorado.  Afterwards, he was a regional vice president for Frontier Airlines. Rocky died March 6, 1951, at age 46 of a heart attack.

The airline was very popular among Arizonans. It was the subject of an article in Arizona Highways magazine in 1947. But Arizona Airways faced heavy competition from other carriers, and its operating costs were high due to high demand for parts and fuel as World War II raged in Europe, two factors which negatively affected the airline's economy. Eventually, the original Arizona Airways was merged along with Challenger Airlines and Monarch Airlines into Frontier Airlines on June 1, 1950.

See also 
 List of defunct airlines of the United States

References

 Lamkins, Jake "Arizona Airways website".  http://FAL-1.tripod.com/Arizona.html

Notes

External links 
 Old Frontier Airlines a website about the history of the old Frontier Airlines and its predecessor airlines.

Airlines established in 1942
Companies based in Phoenix, Arizona
Airlines based in Arizona
Defunct airlines of the United States
Airlines disestablished in 1950
Defunct companies based in Arizona
American companies established in 1942
1946 establishments in Arizona
1950 disestablishments in Arizona
1950 mergers and acquisitions